Harro Heuser (December 26, 1927 in Nastätten – February 21, 2011) was a German mathematician. In German-speaking countries he is best known for his popular two-volume introduction into real analysis, Lehrbuch der Analysis.

Heuser studied mathematics, physics and philosophy from 1948 to 1954 at the University of Tübingen to receive a teaching degree (Staatsexamen) and went on to study for his PhD, which he received in 1957. The advisor of his thesis, entitled Über Operatoren mit endlichen Defekten, was Helmut Wielandt. After receiving his PhD he moved to the University of Karlsruhe, where he received his habilitation in 1962. In 1963 he became a professor at the University of Kiel and in 1964 at the University of Mainz. Finally in 1968 he became a tenured professor at the University of Karlsruhe, where he remained until his retirement in 1996. He was also temporarily working as a visiting professor in the United States, Canada, Colombia and Italy.

Works 
with Heinz Günther Tillmann as editors: Funkkolleg Mathematik. Eine Einführung in 2 Bänden.  Fischer 1974
Funktionalanalysis. Theorie und Anwendung. 1975; 4th edition, Teubner 2006,  (review)
 English edition: Functional Analysis. Wiley 1982,  
Lehrbuch der Analysis - Teil 1. 1980; 17th edition, Teubner 2009, 
Lehrbuch der Analysis - Teil 2. 1981; 14th edition, Teubner 2008, 
with Hellmuth Wolf: Algebra, Funktionalanalysis und Codierung. Eine Einführung für Ingenieure. Teubner 1986, 
Gewöhnliche Differentialgleichungen. Einführung in Lehre und Gebrauch. 1989; 6th edition, Teubner 2009, 
Als die Götter lachen lernten. Griechische Denker verändern die Welt. 1992; 2nd edition, Piper 1997
Die Magie der Zahlen. Von einer seltsamen Lust, die Welt zu ordnen. Herder 2003, 
Der Physiker Gottes. Isaac Newton oder Die Revolution des Denkens. Herder 2005, 
Unendlichkeiten. Nachrichten aus dem Grand Canyon des Geistes. Teubner 2007,

Notes

External links
 Sterling K. Berberian:Review: Harro Heuser, Funktionanalysis, and Richard B. Holmes, Geometric functional analysis and its applications, and Michael Reed and Barry Simon, Functional analysis, and Michael Reed and Barry Simon, Methods of modern mathematical physics, vol. II, Fourier analysis, self-adjointness. Bull. Amer. Math. Soc. Volume 82, Number 6, 1976

1927 births
2011 deaths
20th-century German mathematicians
University of Tübingen alumni
Academic staff of the Karlsruhe Institute of Technology